Akwa Ibom North-East Senatorial District in Akwa Ibom State covers 9 local governments areas which consist Ibiono Ibom, Itu,  Uyo,  Uruan, Ibesikpo Asutan, Nsit Ibom, Nsit Atai, Etinan,  Nsit Ubium. Akwa Ibom North-East is also known as Uyo which is its headquarters. As of 2019, this district has 94 Registration Areas (RAs) and 987 polling units (PUs) and its collation centre is located in the Uyo  LGA INEC office. Obong Bassey Albert Akpan of the People’s Democratic Party is the current representative of Akwa Ibom North-East.

List of senators representing Akwa Ibom North-East

References 

Politics of Akwa Ibom State
Senatorial districts in Nigeria